Robert Victor Macklin (born 1941 in Brisbane) is an Australian author and journalist. He was educated at Ironside Primary School, Brisbane Grammar, and Australian National University.

He began his writing career for the Courier Mail (Brisbane), later moving to The Age in Melbourne and then The Bulletin in Sydney and The Canberra Times in Canberra. In 1967 he became press secretary to Deputy Prime Minister John McEwen shortly before the death of Harold Holt when McEwen briefly became Prime Minister.

In 1974 while working in the Philippines at the Asian Development Bank he began writing both fiction and non-fiction books, beginning with the novel The Queenslander. Awarded a Commonwealth Writer's Fellowship, he returned to Australia in 1975 and wrote The Paper Castle (1978) and Juryman (1980), adapted by MGM to the film Storyville (1994) starring James Spader and Jason Robards.

His non-fiction work includes Seven Cities of Australia, Dark Paradise, Norfolk Island: Isolation, Savagery, Murder; 100 Great Australians, The Secret Life of Jesus, Jacka VC: Australian Hero, Fire in the Blood: The epic tale of Frank Gardiner and Australia's other bushrangers, Bravest: How Some of Australia's Greatest War Heroes Won Their Medals, the memoir War Babies, Kevin Rudd: The Biography, My Favourite Teacher, The Great Australian Pie, One False Move, SAS Sniper (with Rob Maylor), Redback One, SAS Insider, Warrior Elite, Hamilton Hume, Dragon & Kangaroo.

With Peter Thompson he co-authored The Battle of Brisbane, The Man Who Died Twice – the life and adventures of Morrison of China, Kill The Tiger, Keep Off the Skyline and The Big Fella: The Rise and Rise of BHP Billiton.

His awards include the Blake Dawson Prize for Business Literature (with Peter Thompson) in 2009, and Canberra Critics Circle awards for One False Move, Dark Paradise and Hamilton Hume - Our Greatest Explorer.

He is a graduate of the screen writing course of the Australian Film, Television and Radio School and has written and directed documentary films in 32 countries of Asia and the South Pacific. With producer Andrew Pike he has written the screenplay Barefoot on Australia’s only Chinese bushranger, Sam Poo.
 
Married to Wendy Macklin, he has two sons, and currently divides his time between Canberra and Tuross Head.

Works
 The Queenslander (Corgi, 1978)
 The Paper Castle (Collins, 1977)
Juryman (1982)
100 Great Australians (Currey O'Neil, 1983)
 The Secret Life of Jesus, Pan Books, (1990)
War Babies, A Memoir (Pandanus Books ANU, 2004)
Fire in the Blood: The Epic Tale of Frank Gardiner and Australia's Other Bushrangers (2005)
 Jacka VC: Australian Hero (2006)
 Kevin Rudd - the biography (2007)
 Bravest: How Some of Australia's Greatest War Heroes Won Their Medals (2008)
 SAS Sniper With Rob Maylor (Hachette 2010)
 Dark Paradise - Norfolk Island - Isolation, Savagery, Mystery and Murder (Hachette 2013)
 Redback One, (Hachette 2014)
 SAS Insider, (Hachette 2014)
 Warrior Elite - Z Force to the SAS; Intelligence Operations to Cyber Warfare  (Hachette 2015)
 Hamilton Hume - Our Greatest Explorer (Hachette 2016)
Dragon & Kangaroo: Australia and China's shared history from the goldfields to the present day (2017)
Castaway - the extraordinary survival story of Narcisse Pelletier, a young French cabin boy shipwrecked on Cape York in 1858 (Hachette 2019)

With Peter Thompson
 The Battle of Brisbane (2000)
 Morrison of China (2005)
 Kill the Tiger (2002, 2005)
 Keep off the Skyline (2004)
 The Big Fella - the rise and rise of BHP Billiton (2009)
  Operation Rimau (Hachette 2015)

External links
 Robert Macklin's Web site
 
 Storyville from IMDB

Australian journalists
Australian screenwriters
Australian documentary film directors
Living people
1941 births